This is an incomplete list of notable people affiliated with the University of Paris, often called "La Sorbonne".

Faculty professors 

 Jean-Jacques Ampère (1800–1864), French philologist
 St. Thomas Aquinas (1225–1274), Doctor of the Church, Italian Catholic philosopher and theologian in the scholastic tradition
 François Victor Alphonse Aulard (1849–1928), French historian of the Revolution and Napoleon
 Edvard Beneš (1884 - 1948) President and co-founder of Czechoslovakia
 François-Joseph Bérardier de Bataut (1720–1794), French teacher, writer and translator
 Boetius of Dacia, 13th-century Swedish philosopher
 St. Bonaventure (1221–1274), a Franciscan theologian and Doctor of the Church
 George Buchanan (1506–1582), Scottish historian
 Victor Cousin (1792–1867), French philosopher
 Marie Curie (1867–1934), Polish-French chemist, pioneer in the early field of radiology and the first two-time Nobel laureate
 Jean Philibert Damiron (1794–1862), French philosopher
 Jacques Derrida (1930–2004), Algerian-born French literary critic and philosopher of Jewish descent
 Claude Charles Fauriel (1772–1844), French historian, philologist and critic
 St. Edmund of Abingdon (c. 1174–1240), English Saint and Archbishop of Canterbury
 François Géré (1950-), research director, specializing in geostrategic issues
 Nicolas Eugène Géruzez (1799–1865), French critic
 Étienne Gilson (1884–1978), French philosopher and historian of philosophy
 François Guizot (1787–1874), French historian, orator and statesman
 Jacques Hadamard (1865-1963), French mathematician
 Paul Janet (1823–1899), French philosopher and writer
 Frédéric Joliot (1900–1958), French physicist and Nobel laureate
 Irène Joliot-Curie (1897–1956), Nobel Prize–winning French scientist; daughter of Marie Curie and Pierre Curie
 Robert Kilwardby (c. 1215–1279), English Cardinal and Archbishop of Canterbury
 Stephen Langton (c. 1150–1228), English Cardinal and Archbishop of Canterbury
 Albertus Magnus (between 1193 and 1206–1280), Doctor of the Church, Dominican friar, German philosopher and theologian
 Pierre Martin Ngô Đình Thục (1897–1984), Roman Catholic Archbishop of Huế, Vietnam
 Frédéric Ozanam (1813–1853), French-Catholic scholar
 John Peckham (c. 1230–1292), English Archbishop of Canterbury
 Henri Poincaré (1854–1912), mathematician, theoretical physicist, philosopher of science
 Pierre Paul Royer-Collard (1763–1845), French statesman and philosopher, leader of the Doctrinaires group
 Émile Saisset (1814–1863), French philosopher
 Étienne Vacherot (1809–1897), French philosophical writer
 Abel-François Villemain (1790–1870), French politician and writer
 Robert Winchelsey (c. 1245–1313), English Cardinal and Archbishop of Canterbury

Notable alumni 

 Michel Aflaq (1910–1989), ideological founder of Ba'athism, a form of Arab nationalism
 Milos Alcalay (born 1945), Venezuelan diplomat
 Alexander Alekhine (1892–1946), World Chess Champion
 Pope Alexander V (1339–1410), Pope or antipope during the Western Schism
 Nathan Alterman (1910–70), Israeli poet and playwright
 Luis López Álvarez (born 1930), Spanish poet
 Mirza Javad Khan Ameri (1891–1980), Iranian politician
 Reginald Fraser Amonoo (born 1932), ghanaian academic
 Theo Angelopoulos (born 1936), Greek film director
 St. Thomas Aquinas (1225–1274), Italian Catholic philosopher and theologian in the scholastic tradition
 Antoine Arnauld (1612–1694), Roman Catholic theologian and writer
 Robert Badinter, Professor of Law
 Joaquín Balaguer (1906–2002), President of the Dominican Republic
 Honoré de Balzac (1799–1850), writer
 Roland Barthes (1915–1980, literary critic, literary and social theorist, philosopher and semiotician
 Jean Baudrillard (1929–2007), Cultural theorist and philosopher
 Simone de Beauvoir (1908–1986), author, philosopher, and feminist
Eliezer Ben-Yehuda (1858–1922),  Litvak lexicographer of Hebrew and newspaper editor
 Pope Benedict XVI (1927-2022), born Joseph Alois Ratzinger
 Sergei Natanovich Bernstein (1880-1968), Russian and Soviet mathematician
 Ernst Boepple (1887–1950), German Nazi official and SS officer executed for war crimes
 Nicolas Boileau-Despréaux (1636–1711), poet and critic
 Habib Bourguiba (c. 1903–2000), first President of Tunisia (1957–1987)
 Paschase Broët French Jesuit and early companion of Ignatius of Loyola
 George Buchanan (1506–1582), Scottish historian
 Gerald M. Moser (1915–2005), German-American academic and author
 John Calvin (1509–1564), Protestant Reformer and proponent of Calvinism
 Roch Carrier (born 1937), Canadian novelist
 Pierre Cartier (born 1932), mathematician
 Constantin-François Chassebœuf, philosopher and count
 Adrienne Clarkson (born 1939), Governor General of Canada
 Conrad of Megenberg (born 1309), German historian
 Marie Skłodowska-Curie (1867–1934), physicist, Nobel Prize in Physics in 1903 with her husband Pierre Curie, Nobel Prize in Chemistry in 1911
 Pierre Curie (1859–1906), physicist, Nobel Prize in Physics in 1903 with his wife Marie Skłodowska-Curie
 Gilles Deleuze (1925–1995), philosopher
 Hasan Dosti (1895–1991), Albanian jurist and politician
 St. Maurice Duault (1117–1191), French abbot and saint
 Raymond Duchamp-Villon (1876–1918), sculptor
 St. Edmund of Abingdon (c. 1174–1240), English Saint and Archbishop of Canterbury
 Desiderius Erasmus (1466/1469–1536), Dutch humanist and theologian
 Peter Faber (1506–1546), Christian missionary and co-founder of the Society of Jesus
 Moshé Feldenkrais (1904–1984), founder of the Feldenkrais Method of movement education
 Lawrence Ferlinghetti (born 1919), poet and co-owner of the City Lights Bookstore and publishing house
 David Feuerwerker (1912–1980), rabbi and historian
 Jean-Luc Godard (born 1930), film director
 Haim Gouri (born 1923), Israeli poet, novelist, journalist, and documentary filmmaker
 Abimael Guzmán (born 1934), leader of the Maoist guerrilla movement Sendero Luminoso in Peru
 Francis Seymour Haden (1818–1910), English surgeon, best known as an etcher
 Pavel Hak (born 1962), playwright and author
 Mahmoud Hessaby (1903–1992), Iranian scientist and politician
 Ivica Hiršl (1905–1941), Croatian communist and Mayor of Koprivnica
 Enver Hoxha (1908–1985), Albanian communist dictator (1946–1985)
 Victor Hugo (1802–1885), Romantic novelist, playwright, essayist and statesman
 St. Ignatius of Loyola (1491–1556), founder of the Society of Jesus
 Luce Irigaray (born 1930), French feminist, psychoanalytic and cultural theorist
 Irène Joliot-Curie (1897–1956), scientist, shared the Nobel Prize in Chemistry 1935 with her husband Frédéric Joliot
 Max Karoubi (born 1938), mathematician
 Vilayat Inayat Khan (born 1916), Sufic leader and writer
 Robert Kilwardby (c. 1215–1279), English Cardinal and Archbishop of Canterbury
 Dimitri Kitsikis (born 1935), Fellow, Royal Society of Canada
 Jean-Louis Koszul (1921-2018), mathematician
 Arvid Kurck (1464–1522), Finnish bishop
 Stephen Langton (c. 1150–1228), English Cardinal and Archbishop of Canterbury
 Ronald Lauder (born 1944), American businessman, art collector, philanthropist, and political activist
 Antoine-Laurent Lavoisier (1743–1794), father of modern chemistry, developed the law of conservation of mass
 Theodore K. Lawless (1892-1971), American dermatologist, medical researcher, and philanthropist
 Diego Laynez (1512–1565), Roman Catholic theologian, and the second general of the Society of Jesus
 Henri Lefebvre (1901–1991), Marxist sociologist and philosopher
 Bernard Lewis (born 1916), British American historian specializing in oriental studies
 Claude Lévi-Strauss (1908–2009), anthropologist who developed structuralism
 Mélanie Lipinska (1900s), Historian of Female Scientists 
 Peter Lombard (c. 1100–1160/64), Roman Catholic theologian
 Jean-François Lyotard (1924–1998), philosopher and literary theorist
 Hilda Madsen (1910–1981), British-American artist and dog breeder
 Norman Mailer (1923–2007), American writer
 John Mair (also known as John Major) (1467–1550), Scottish philosopher
 Benoît Mandelbrot (1923-2010), mathematician
 Fabrizio Marrella (born 1966), Italian scholar; Full Professor of International Law & International Business Law; former European Director of the Master in Human Rights
 Marsilius of Padua (1270–1342), Italian scholar; Rector of the university 1313
 Bernard Miège (born 1941), media theorist
 Sherman Minton, Democratic United States Senator from Indiana; Associate Justice of the Supreme Court of the United States
 François Mitterrand, former President of France
 André Morellet (1727–1819), economist and writer
 Jacqueline Kennedy Onassis (1930-1994), wife of US President John F. Kennedy and Greek shipping magnate Aristotle Onassis; US First Lady 1961-1963
 Mikhail Vasilievich Ostrogradsky (1801–1862), Ukrainian mathematician, mechanician and physicist
 John Peckham (c. 1230–1292), English Archbishop of Canterbury
 José Francisco Peña Gómez (1937–1998), leader of the Dominican Revolutionary Party
 Denis Pétau (1583–1652), Jesuit theologian
 Konstanin "Koča" Popović (1908-1992), Spanish Civil War volunteer, Yugoslav Partisans division commander and Yugoslav statesman
 Peter of Blois (1135–1203), poet and diplomat
 Paul H. Raihle (born 1893), member of the Wisconsin State Assembly
 Pauline Réage (1907–1998), author
 Paul Ricœur (1913–2005), philosopher
 Vera Maria Rosenberg (Vera Atkins of SOE)
 Ibrahim Rugova (1944–2006), first President of Kosovo
 Modjtaba Sadria (1949-), philosopher, Honorary Professor of Centre for Ethics in Medicine and Society in Monash University, Australia
 Émile Saisset (1814–1863), philosopher
 Nawaf Salam, Ambassador and Permanent Representative of Lebanon to the United Nations
 Alfonso Salmeron (1511–1590), theologian, and one of the original members of the Society of Jesus
 Menachem Mendel Schneerson, the seventh Lubavitch Rebbe of the Chabad Hasidei Dynasty and World Jewish Outreach Organization
 Jean-Pierre Serre (born 1926), mathematician
 Ali Shariati (1933–1977), Iranian sociologist
 Emmanuel Joseph Sieyès (1748–1836), French statesman; revolutionary leader; instigator of the coup d'état of 18 Brumaire, which brought Napoleon Bonaparte to power
 Joshua Sobol (born 1939), Israeli playwright, writer, and director 
 Susan Sontag (1933–2004), American writer and activist
 Jean Stein, American author and editor
 Hasan Tahsini (1811-1881), Albanian scholar
 Andrea Tantaros, (born 1978), American political commentator
 Pierre Teilhard de Chardin (1881–1955), Jesuit Priest, paleontologist and philosopher
 René Thom (1923-2002), mathematician
 Dale C. Thomson DFC (1923–1999), Canadian academic, author, Prime Ministerial advisor
 Marina Tsvetaeva (1892–1941), Russian poet and writer
 Seka Severin de Tudja (1923–2007), Yugoslavian-born Venezuelan ceramist
 Anne-Robert-Jacques Turgot, Baron de Laune (1727–1781), French statesman and economist
 John Turner (born 1929), former Canadian Prime Minister
 Maria Ubach i Font (born 1973), current Minister of Foreign Affairs of Andorra
 Simone Veil (1927-2017), lawyer and politician, Minister of Health, President of the European Parliament, and member of the Constitutional Council of France
 Jacques Vergès (born 1925), lawyer
 Andreas Vesalius (1514–1564), Belgian physician and anatomist
 Sérgio Vieira de Mello (1948–2003), Brazilian United Nations diplomat
 Paul Virilio (born 1932), cultural theorist and urbanist
 Walter of Châtillon, 12th-century writer and theologian
 Sam Waterston (born 1940), American actor
 André Weil (1906-1998), mathematician
 Ruth Westheimer (born Karola Siegel, 1928; known as "Dr. Ruth"), German-American sex therapist, talk show host, author, professor, Holocaust survivor, and former Haganah sniper.
 Elie Wiesel (1928–2016), Romanian-born American Holocaust survivor, Nobel Laureate. novelist and political activist
 Robert Winchelsey (c. 1245–1313), English Cardinal and Archbishop of Canterbury
 St. Francis Xavier (1506–1552), Christian missionary and co-founder of the Society of Jesus
 Nasser Yeganeh, PhD in public law, former President of the Supreme Court of Iran

References

 
Paris
Paris-related lists